The Sigil of Baphomet is the official insignia of the Church of Satan. It first appeared on the cover of The Satanic Mass LP in 1968 and later on the cover of The Satanic Bible in 1969. The sigil has been called a "material pentagram" representational of carnality and earthy principles. The Church describes the symbol as the "...preeminent visual distillation of the iconoclastic philosophy of Satanism."

History
The familiar goat's head inside an inverted pentagram did not become the foremost symbol of Satanism until the founding of the Church of Satan in 1966. The original goat pentagram containing the Hebrew letters at the five points of the pentagram spelling out Leviathan (לויתן), the ancient serpent from the biblical Chaoskampf, first appeared in the book La Clef de la Magie Noire by French occultist Stanislas de Guaita, in 1897. With the pentagram inverted, matter is ruling over spirit, a condition associated with evil. In the book, de Guaita also showed an upright pentagram with the Pentagrammaton (יהשוה) at the vertices of the pentagram. The Pentagrammaton is an esoteric version of the Hebrew name of Jesus, Yeshua, (ישוע) by adding the letter shin (ש) in the middle of the Tetragrammaton divine name Yod-He-Vav-He, (יהוה). The lower four points represented the four elements of the material world, while the uppermost point represented spirit ruling over matter. The upper Pentacle includes The concept of an inverted pentagram being a representation of evil and an upright pentagram symbolizing holiness originated with the 19th-century French occultist Eliphas Lévi. Anton LaVey, the founder of the Church of Satan based his “Sigil of Baphomet” on this image. This symbol was later used in Maurice Bessy's book A Pictorial History of Magic and the Supernatural, with the words "Samael" and "Lilith" removed.

During his years of research into the "black arts", LaVey had come across this book and added it to his collection. When he chose to turn his magic circle, the Order of the Trapezoid, into the Church of Satan, he decided that the symbol was the one which most fully embodied the principles which were the bedrock of the Satanic church. Contrary to claims made against the Church by detractors, LaVey never claimed to have created this particular symbol. In its formative years, this particular version of the symbol was utilized by the Church on membership cards, stationery, medallions and most notably above the altar in the ritual chamber of the Black House. During the writing of The Satanic Bible, it was decided that a unique version of the symbol should be rendered to be identified exclusively with the Church. The complete graphic now known as the Sigil of Baphomet, named such for the first time in LaVey's The Satanic Rituals, first appeared on the cover of The Satanic Mass LP in 1968 and later on the cover of The Satanic Bible in 1969. This version was drawn by LaVey and attributed to "Hugo Zorilla" (a pseudonym used by LaVey in some of his art).

The sigil, when combined with the text "The First Church of Satan", was previously trademarked by the Church of Satan, but the trademark was abandoned in 2000.

See also
 Baphomet
 LaVeyan Satanism
 List of occult symbols
 List of sigils of demons

References

External links

 The History of the Origin of the Sigil of Baphomet and its Use in the Church of Satan

Church of Satan
Insignia
Leviathan
Magic symbols
Trademarks